The Irish League in season 1987–88 comprised 14 teams, and Glentoran won the championship.

League standings

Results

References
Northern Ireland - List of final tables (RSSSF)

NIFL Premiership seasons
1987–88 in Northern Ireland association football
Northern